The Florida State Seminoles men's golf team represents Florida State University (variously Florida State or FSU) in the sport of golf. The Seminoles compete in Division I of the National Collegiate Athletic Association (NCAA) and the Atlantic Coast Conference (ACC). They play their home matches on the Don A. Veller Seminole Golf Course on the university's Tallahassee, Florida campus, and are currently led by head coach Trey Jones.

Some notable alumni of the program are Paul Azinger, Hubert Green, Jeff Sluman, George McNeill, Jonas Blixt, Daniel Berger, and Brooks Koepka.

History
In the 69-year history of the Seminoles' men's golf program, they have won 13 conference championships and nine Seminoles have won ten individual conference titles.

Florida State is one of just five universities to have had four alumni win the major championships and Florida State alums have won a total of 58 PGA Tour events.

PGA Tour professionals

Ten different Florida State alumni have represented the University with wins on the PGA Tour, including former Seminole golfers Hubert Green, winner of the 1977 U.S. Open and the 1985 PGA Championship, Jeff Sluman, winner of the 1988 PGA Championship, Paul Azinger, winner of the 1993 PGA Championship, and Brooks Koepka, winner of the 2017 and 2018 U.S. Open as well as the 2018 and 2019 PGA Championship.

Don A. Veller Seminole Golf Course

The Dave Middleton Golf Complex and the Don Veller Seminole Golf Course are home to the PGA Golf Management Program, which is one of only a few programs in the country accredited by the Professional Golfers' Association of America. A 27,000-square-foot clubhouse, the Dave Middleton Golf Complex boasts private Wi-Fi classrooms, study and teaching labs, an internship library, a fully equipped club repair room, a pro shop, locker rooms and the Renegade Grill. The $7 million facility is a two-building complex, which also includes a multi-directional driving range, a video analysis instructional center with hitting bays for inclement weather, chipping and putting greens, as well as locker rooms, a team lounge, auditorium and fitness facility.

The golf course was renovated in 2004 with the reconstruction of all 18 greens, complexes, tee boxes and the state-of-the-art
TiffEagle Turf was installed on all the putting surfaces. Each year the facility hosts more than 60,000 rounds of golf. The golf course was recently recognized as one of the top 10 golf courses in the country by the National Golf Foundation for customer loyalty and satisfaction. In 2007 a new 21,000-square-foot (2,000 m2) chipping green was added in the southeast corner near the 29 driving range boxes. A 10-acre (40,000 m2) practice facility is used by the FSU golf team and students in the PGM program.

In 2017, the University announced that Nicklaus Design had been hired to renovate the course at a cost of $4–6 million.

See also 

Florida State Seminoles
Florida State Seminoles women's golf

References

External links
 Seminoles.com – Official website of the Florida State Seminoles men's golf team.